A truth and reconciliation commission is an official body tasked with discovering and revealing past wrongdoing by a government or other actors, in the hope of resolving conflict left over from the past.

Truth and Reconciliation Commission may also refer to:

By country
Truth and Reconciliation Commission (Burundi)
Truth and Reconciliation Commission of Canada
National Truth and Reconciliation Commission of Chile, which produced the Rettig Report (1991)
Truth and Reconciliation Commission (Ivory Coast)
Truth and Reconciliation Commission (DRC), Democratic Republic of the Congo
Truth and Reconciliation Commission (Germany)
Truth and Reconciliation Commission (Honduras)
Truth and Reconciliation Commission (Liberia)
Truth and Reconciliation Commission (Nepal)
Truth and Reconciliation Commission (Norway)
Truth and Reconciliation Commission (Peru)
Truth and Reconciliation Commission (Sierra Leone)
Truth and Reconciliation Commission (Solomon Islands)
Truth and Reconciliation Commission (South Africa)
Truth and Reconciliation Commission (South Korea)

Other places
Greensboro Truth and Reconciliation Commission, Greensboro, North Carolina, United States
Maine Wabanaki-State Truth and Reconciliation Commission, Maine, United States

See also
Commission for Reception, Truth and Reconciliation in East Timor (2001)
Historical Clarification Commission, Guatemala (1994)
Lessons Learnt and Reconciliation Commission (2010), Sri Lanka
List of truth and reconciliation commissions
Reconciliation and Unity Commission (proposed 2005), Fiji
Truth and reconciliation in Myanmar
Truth Commission (disambiguation)